Andrea Gámiz and Aymet Uzcátegui were the defending champions, but chose not to participate.

Anna Bondár and Paula Ormaechea won the title, defeating Amandine Hesse and Daniela Seguel in the final, 7–5, 7–5.

Seeds

Draw

Draw

References
Main Draw

Zagreb Ladies Open - Doubles
Zagreb Ladies Open